The Nokia E61 is a smartphone from the Eseries range, a S60 3rd Edition device targeting business users in the European market. It was announced as part of the new Eseries business line on 12 October 2005 along with the Nokia E60 and E70. As of Q4 2006 Cingular and Rogers Wireless have deployed a similar yet restricted version designated the Nokia E62 in the North American and Brazilian markets.  The E62 is substantially similar but without an 802.11 WiFi chipset or W-CDMA (UMTS) 3G support. E61 supports 900/1800/1900 bands, while E62 can operate in 850/900/1800/1900 in order to support American networks.

On 12 February 2007 Nokia announced the E61i as a follow up product.

Characteristics

Additional features 
 Base Band 5 SIM locking software
 Push to Talk over Cellular (PoC)
 PIM including calendar, to-do list and printing
 Optional Blackberry and other push e-mail service support
 117 mm × 69.7 mm × 14 mm, 108 cc, 144 g
 Vibrating alert
 VoIP capable (integrated SIP client)
 Loudspeak
 Support for Java ME and native Symbian applications

Included software 
 General
 Personal Organizer / Calendar
 File Manager
 Contacts Manager
 Media viewers
 Music Player (supports MP3, AAC, WAV, AMR)
 RealPlayer
 Image browser
 Internet
 Web browser
 WAP browser (separate to web browser)
 Email client (POP3, SMTP, IMAP)
 Office
 Word processor
 Spreadsheet
 Presentation software

Included accessories 
 Mono earphone with inline microphone and answer key
 CA-44 adapter converting former Nokia 3.5 mm power plug to the new 2 mm plug
 Data cable CA-53 from Nokia Pop-Port to USB-A type male connector
 Quick start and user's guide, errata, additional applications booklet
 Charger

Interface and connectors 
 Front Indicator light, Earpiece, Power key, Quarter VGA landscape display, Left selection key, Menu key, Five-way joystick, E-mail key, Right selection key, Call key, End key, 10×4 keyboard also functioning as keypad
 Left side  Loudspeaker, Up-down volume keys, Voice key
 Bottom  Power jack, 14 pole pop-port connector, Microphone, Infrared transceiver
 Back  Battery cover release
 Battery compartment  MiniSD Card slot (for E61) or MicroSD slot (for E61i), 3 pole battery connector, SIM
 Internal  Joystick, display (molex)

E61i 

The Nokia E61i is a smartphone from the Eseries range, an S60v3 device targeting business users in the European market. It's an update to the Nokia E61 released in 2006. This product was announced on 12 February 2007 at 3GSM World Congress.

The main differences over the E61 include:

 2 Megapixel camera
 Navi key instead of a joystick
 Additional buttons to access quick functions
 Slimmer case design
 Updated version battery
 Upgradeable to newer firmware
 MicroSD instead of MiniSD
 64 MB of RAM
Keyboard keys spaced more

See also 
 Nokia
 Nokia Eseries
 List of Nokia products
 BlackBerry
 Nokia E71 – Successor

References

External links

E61i 
 Nokia E61i and Motorola Q9H head to head review from The Register
 E61i specifications

Reviews 
 CNET – Australia, U.K.
 IT Week – Nokia E61 review from a business perspective

Mobile phones with an integrated hardware keyboard
Nokia ESeries
Mobile phones introduced in 2006
Mobile phones with infrared transmitter
Mobile phones with user-replaceable battery